A widow's peak is a genetic trait affecting the appearance of the hairline.

Widows' Peak or Widow's Peak can also refer to:
Widows' Peak, a 1994 film
Widowspeak, a band from Brooklyn, NY
Widow's Peak, a professional wrestling move
Widow's walk often referred to as a widow's peak